Drawbridge Peak is located on the Continental Divide along the provincial borders of Alberta and British Columbia. The Alberta side is in Jasper National Park while Mount Robson Provincial Park is on the B.C. side. It was named in 1920 by the Interprovincial Boundary Survey.

See also
List of peaks on the Alberta–British Columbia border
Mountains of Alberta
Mountains of British Columbia

References

Two-thousanders of Alberta
Two-thousanders of British Columbia
Canadian Rockies